Milius may refer to:

USS Milius (DDG-69), missile destroyer of the United States Navy
Pope Avilius of Alexandria, also known as Milius, Patriarch of Alexandria between 83 and 95

People with the surname
Jeronimas Milius (born 1984), Lithuanian singer
John Milius (born 1944), American screenwriter and director

Film
Milius (film), a 2013 documentary about the filmmaker